The West Virginia Department of Transportation (WVDOT) is the state agency responsible for transportation in West Virginia.  The Department of Transportation serves an umbrella organization for seven subsidiary agencies which are directly responsible for different areas of the state's infrastructure.

Subsidiary agencies

Division of Highways
The West Virginia Division of Highways (DOH) is the largest component of the Department of Transportation.  It is responsible for almost all public roads in the state outside of incorporated municipalities.  The Division of Highways was previously its own standalone agency, the Department of Highways, and was known as the State Road Commission until about the 1970s.

Division of Motor Vehicles
The West Virginia Division of Motor Vehicles (DMV) handles vehicle registration and driver licensing for the state.  In addition to its headquarters in Charleston, it operates a network of 23 regional offices throughout West Virginia.

West Virginia Parkways Authority

The West Virginia Parkways Authority was created in 1989 as a successor to the West Virginia Turnpike Commission.  The agency is tasked with operating the West Virginia Turnpike, an  tolled stretch of Interstate 77 from Charleston to Princeton.  It was involved in the planned operation of a toll U.S. Route 35 in Mason and Putnam counties and the Mon-Fayette Expressway, however WV 43 was opened as a freeway and a possible toll US 35 completion was rejected by the Legislature in 2012.

The Parkways Authority used to be named the Parkways, Economic Development, and Tourism Authority.  It participated in economic development programs, an activity that was curtailed under former governor Joe Manchin.  It continues to operate Tamarack, Best of West Virginia, an arts and crafts center near Beckley, pending its transfer to the West Virginia Department of Commerce.

Division of Multimodal Transportation Facilities
The Division of Multimodal Transportation Facilities was created in 2022 and is tasked with operating the State Rail Authority, Division of Public Transit, Public Port Authority, and Aeronautics Commission.

State Rail Authority
The State Rail Authority was formed to assume ownership of rail lines that were planned for abandonment by their original operators.  It directly operates the South Branch Valley Railroad, a former  Baltimore & Ohio Railroad line between Green Spring and Petersburg.

The authority also owns the West Virginia Central Railroad, consisting of  near Elkins.  The West Virginia Central is operated by a private company, the Durbin and Greenbrier Valley Railroad.

Other State Rail Authority duties include promoting tourist and short-line railroads, operating three MARC train stations in the Eastern Panhandle, and helping to preserve or railbank lines targeted for abandonment.

Division of Public Transit
The Division of Public Transit helps assist public transit agencies in the state.

Public Port Authority
The Public Port Authority helps to develop and market ports and intermodal facilities in the state.

Aeronautics Commission
The Aeronautics Commission helps to develop and fund air infrastructure projects in West Virginia.

References

State departments of transportation of the United States
State agencies of West Virginia